ICCSD  may refer to:

 International Chiropractic Sport Science Diploma 
 Iowa City Community School District
Izard County Consolidated School District